Tulsa Public Schools is an independent school district serving the Tulsa, Oklahoma area in Northeastern Oklahoma. As of 2022, it is the largest school district in Oklahoma, surpassing Oklahoma City Public Schools for the first time since 2013.
As of 2022 the district serves approximately 33,211 students. It is governed by an elected school board.  As of November 2021, the Tulsa Public Schools district is accredited by the Oklahoma State Department of Education.

History 

In 2022, Governor of Oklahoma Kevin Stitt asked the Oklahoma State Auditor and Inspector to investigate the school district.

Schools 
Tulsa Public Schools is made up of 46 elementary, 12 middle schools, and 13 high schools. (according to their website www.tulsaschools.org)

Elementary

Junior High 
 Carver
 Central Junior High
 East Central Junior High
 Edison Preparatory
 Hale Junior High
 Mclain 7th grade Academy
 Mclain Junior High
 Memorial Junior High
 Monroe Demonstration Academy
 Thoreau
 Webster MS
 Will Rogers College Junior High

High schools 
 Booker T. Washington
 Central
 East Central
 Edison Preparatory
 Hale
 McLain
 Memorial
 Street School
 TRAICE
 Tulsa Learning Academy
 Tulsa MET
 Webster
 Will Rogers College High

Charter/Partner schools 
 College Bound Academy
 Collegiate Hall
 Greenwood Leadership Academy
 KIPP Tulsa College Preparatory
 Tulsa Honor Academy
 Tulsa Legacy Charter
 Tulsa School of Arts and Sciences

School board
The Tulsa School Board has seven members, each representing a different geographic area of the district. Each board member is elected to a four-year term, and the terms of each member are staggered so every year at least one member is up for election.
The school board establishes policies, manages the budget, hires the superintendent, and is the final appeals board for the district.
The school board's authority is limited to official meetings.

School Board Members
District 1 Stacey Woolley (President)(Elected 2019. Term expires 2023.)
District 2 Judith Barba Perez  (Elected 2021. Term expires 2025.)
District 3 Jennettie Marshall (Elected 2017, re-elected 2021. Term expires 2025.)
District 4 E'Lena Ashley (Elected 2022, Term expires 2026.)
District 5 John Croisant (Vice President) (Elected 2020. Term expires 2024.)
District 6 Dr. Jerry Griffin (Elected 2020. Term expires 2024.)
District 7 Susan Lamkin (Elected 2022. Term expires 2026.)

References

External links
 Tulsa Public Schools

School districts in Oklahoma
Tulsa Public Schools